A cave dweller, or troglodyte, is a human who inhabits a cave or the area beneath the overhanging rocks of a cliff.

Prehistory 
Some prehistoric humans were cave dwellers, but most were not  (see Homo and Human evolution). Such early cave dwellers, and other prehistoric peoples, are also called cave men (the term also refers to the stereotypical "caveman" stock character type from fiction and popular culture). Despite the name, only a small portion of humanity has ever dwelt in caves: caves are rare across most of the world; most caves are dark, cold, and damp; and other cave inhabitants, such as bears and cave bears, cave lions, and cave hyenas, often made caves inhospitable for people.

The Grotte du Vallonnet, a cave in the French Riviera, was used by people approximately one million years ago. Although stone tools and the remains of eaten animals have been found in the cave, there is no indication that people dwelt in it.

Since about 750,000 years ago, the Zhoukoudian cave system, in Beijing, China, has been inhabited by various species of human being, including Peking Man (Homo erectus pekinensis) and modern humans (Homo sapiens).

Starting about 170,000 years ago, some Homo sapiens lived in some cave systems in what is now South Africa, such as Pinnacle Point and Diepkloof Rock Shelter. The stable temperatures of caves provided a cool habitat in summers and a warm, dry shelter in the winter. Remains of grass bedding have been found in nearby Border Cave.

About 100,000 years ago, some Neanderthals dwelt in caves in Europe and western Asia. Caves there also were inhabited by some Cro-Magnons, from about 35,000 years ago until about 8000 B.C. Both species built shelters, including tents, at the mouths of caves and used the caves’ dark interiors for ceremonies. The Cro-Magnon people also made representational paintings on cave walls.

Also about 100,000 years ago, some Homo sapiens worked in Blombos Cave, in what became South Africa. They made the earliest paint workshop now known, but apparently did not dwell in the caves.

Writers of the classical Greek and Roman period made several allusions to cave-dwelling tribes in different parts of the world. For details, see "Troglodytae".

Historical 

Especially during war and other times of strife, small groups of people have lived temporarily in caves, where they have hidden or otherwise sought refuge.  They also have used caves for clandestine and other special purposes while living elsewhere.

Perhaps fleeing the violence of Ancient Romans, people left the Dead Sea Scrolls in eleven caves near Qumran, in what is now an area of the West Bank managed by Qumran National Park, in Israel. The documents remained undisturbed there for about 2,000 years, until their discovery in the 1940s and 1950s.

The DeSoto Caverns, in what became Alabama in the United States, were a burial ground for local tribes; the same caves became a violent speakeasy in the 1920s. The Caves of St. Louis may have been a hiding-place along the Underground Railroad.

From about 1000 to about 1300, some Pueblo people lived in villages that they built beneath cliffs in what is now the Southwestern United States.

In Hirbet Tawani, near Yatta Village, in the Southern Hebron Hills, in an area contested by the Palestinian Authority and Israel, there are Palestinians living in caves. People also inhabited caves there during the time of the Ottoman Empire and of the British Mandate for Palestine. In recent years some have been evicted by the Israeli government and settlers.

In her book Home Life in Colonial Days, Alice Morse Earle wrote of some of the first European settlers in New England, New York, and Pennsylvania living in cave dwellings, also known as "smoaky homes":

In Pennsylvania caves were used by newcomers as homes for a long time, certainly half a century. They generally were formed by digging into the ground about four feet in depth on the banks or low cliffs near the river front. The walls were then built up of sods or earth laid on poles or brush; thus half only of the chamber was really under ground. If dug into a side hill, the earth formed at least two walls. The roofs were layers of tree limbs covered over with sod, or bark, or rushes and bark. The chimneys were laid of cobblestone or sticks of wood mortared with clay and grass. The settlers were thankful even for these poor shelters, and declared that they found them comfortable. By 1685 many families were still living in caves in Pennsylvania, for the Governor's Council then ordered the caves to be destroyed and filled in.

In the 1970s, several members of the Tasaday apparently inhabited caves near Cotabato, in the Philippines.

Caves at Sacromonte, near Granada, Spain, are home to about 3,000 Gitano people, whose dwellings range from single rooms to caves of nearly 200 rooms, along with churches, schools, and stores in the caves.

Some families have built modern homes in caves, and renovated old ones, as in Missouri; Matera, Italy; and Spain.

At least 30,000,000 people in China live in cave homes, called yaodongs; because they are warm in the winter and cool in the summer, some people find caves more desirable than concrete homes in the city.

In the Australian desert mining towns of Coober Pedy and Lightning Ridge, many families have carved homes into the underground opal mines, to escape the heat.

In the Loire Valley, abandoned caves are being privately renovated as affordable housing.

In England, the rock houses at Kinver Edge were inhabited until the middle of the 20th century.

In Greece, some Christian hermits and saints are known by the epithet "cave dweller" since they lived in cave dwellings; examples include Joseph the Cave Dweller (also known as Joseph the Hesychast) and Arsenios the Cave Dweller.

See also
 Caveman
 Cave monastery
 Cave painting
 Cave-dwelling Jews

References

External links

 

Cave dwellings